Moyoc (possibly from Quechua for spiral, winding) is a  mountain in the Vilcabamba mountain range in the Andes of Peru. It is located in the Cusco Region, Anta Province, on the border of the districts of Huarocondo and Limatambo, and in the Urubamba Province, Ollantaytambo District. Moyoc lies southeast of Ocobamba and Mount Huayanay.

References

Mountains of Peru
Mountains of Cusco Region